The 2005 Little League World Series took place between August 19 and August 28 in South Williamsport, Pennsylvania. The West Oahu Little League of ʻEwa Beach, Hawaii, defeated the defending champion Pabao Little League of Willemstad, Curaçao, in the championship game of the 59th Little League World Series. This was the second time that the Little League World Series championship game was won with a walk-off home run, which Michael Memea hit in the bottom of the 7th inning.

The tournament used two venues, both in South Williamsport:
Howard J. Lamade Stadium - The main stadium, completed in 1959, with seating capacity for 10,000 in the main stands and hillside terrace seating for up to 30,000 more
Little League Volunteer Stadium - Opened in 2001; seats approximately 5,000

Qualification

Between five and twelve teams take part in 16 regional qualification tournaments, which vary in format depending on region. In the United States, the qualification tournaments are in the same format as the Little League World Series itself: a round-robin tournament followed by an elimination round to determine the regional champion.

Results

Pool play
The top two teams in each pool moved on to their respective semifinals. The winners of each met on August 28 to play for the Little League world championship.

All times US EDT

International

All times US EDT

Elimination round

Notable players
Jurickson Profar (Willemstad, Curacao) - San Diego Padres - Infielder

Max Moroff (Maitland, Florida) - Pittsburgh Pirates - Baseball - Infielder

Andrew Stevenson (Lafayette, Louisiana) - Washington Nationals - Baseball - Outfielder

Johnny Dee (Vista, California) - CB Sevilla - Basketball - Shortstop

Champion's path
According to the information provided at Unpage.com, the West Oahu LL won all ten of its games to reach the LLWS. In total, their record was 16–0.

References

External links
 2005 official results via Wayback Machine

 
Little League World Series
Little League World Series
Little League World Series